Kinzie was a station on the Northwestern Elevated Railroad's North Side Main Line, which is now part of the Chicago Transit Authority's Brown Line. The station was located at Kinzie Street and Wells Street in the Near North Side neighborhood of Chicago. Kinzie opened on May 31, 1900, and closed in 1921; it was replaced by the Grand station. Today, Kinzie Street is serviced by the Brown Line and Purple Line Express at the Merchandise Mart station.

References

Defunct Chicago "L" stations
Railway stations in the United States opened in 1900
Railway stations closed in 1921
1900 establishments in Illinois
1921 disestablishments in Illinois